A curveball is a type of pitch used in the sport of baseball.

Curveball may also refer to:

Curveball (film), a 2020 film
Curveball (informant), code name for Rafid Ahmed Alwan al-Janabi (born 1968), Iraqi informant
Curveball (Ugly Betty), an episode of the television series Ugly Betty
Curveball: The Remarkable Story of Toni Stone the First Woman to Play Professional Baseball in the Negro League, a 2010 book by Martha Ackmann
Curveball: The Year I Lost My Grip, a 2012 book by Jordan Sonnenblick
CurveBall (security vulnerability)